The Kele language, or Lokele, is a Bantu language spoken in the Democratic Republic of the Congo by the Kele people.

Foma (Lifoma) is a dialect.

References

External links
 http://www.nybooks.com/articles/archives/2011/mar/10/how-we-know/?pagination=false

Soko-Kele languages
Languages of the Democratic Republic of the Congo